Tables of Physical and Chemical Constants and Some Mathematical Functions is a scientific reference work. First compiled and published in 1911 by the physicists G. W. C. Kaye and T. H. Laby, it is more commonly known as Kaye and Laby. It is a standard textbook for scientists and engineers.

The final print edition was the 16th in 1995, after which the entire content was made available online in association with the National Physical Laboratory.

The online version was removed on 21 May 2019, the day after the redefinition of the SI base units. An archived version is still available online, but is no longer maintained, and does not have the updated values of physical constants.

References

External links 
 Kaye and Laby online
 About Kaye and Laby
 History of Kaye and Laby

1911 non-fiction books
Chemistry reference works
Mathematics textbooks
2019 disestablishments in the United Kingdom
Physics textbooks